Arena Metato is a village in Tuscany, central Italy, administratively a frazione of the comune of San Giuliano Terme, province of Pisa.

The village is the result of the fusion of the two hamlets of Arena (pop. 204) and Metato (pop. 1,911).

Arena Metato is about 7 km from Pisa and 10 km from San Giuliano Terme.

References 

Frazioni of the Province of Pisa